The Miss Lebanon 2018 beauty pageant was held on September 30, 2018 where 30 candidates from different regions of Lebanon competed for the national crown. First place winner of the pageant was Maya Reaidy. Second place winner was Mira Toufaily. Third place winner was Yara Abou Monsef.

The first place winner of the pageant represents Lebanon at Miss Universe 2018. The second place represents Lebanon at Miss World 2018.

Results

Placements

Jury Members
Demi-Leigh Nel-Peters – Miss Universe 2017 from South Africa
Nancy Ajram – Singer.
Nadine Nassib Njeim – Miss Lebanon 2004
Nicolas Jebran  – Fashion designer.
George Kurdahi – TV presenter.
Adel Karam – Actor and TV presenter.
Guy Manoukian – Composer
 Bassam Fattouh – Make-Up Artist.
 Doumit Zoughaib – Jewelry Designer

Contestants

References

External links
 

Miss Lebanon
2018 in Lebanon
Lebanon
September 2018 events in Lebanon